Einar von Hirsch (5 June 1872 – 20 October 1938) was a Norwegian dentist and landowner.

He was born in Romedal as a son of director Johan Leuthäuser Hirsch (1843–1922) and his first wife Johanne P. Bolstad (1847–1930). In 1901 he married dean's daughter Elise Kjos Hansen. Their son Trygve Hirsch was a well-known barrister and writer, and another son Per von Hirsch a well-known figure during the occupation of Norway by Nazi Germany.

Einar Hirsch graduated as an agronomist in 1896 and as an odontologist in 1904. He was a prolific writer in both agricultural and odontological periodicals. From 1915 to 1921 he edited the periodicals Norsk Tannlægeforenings Tidende and Munnpleien, also chairing the Norwegian Specialized Press Association.

He was a grand proprietor, owning large farms in Lørenskog and Bærum. He is best known for buying the farm Øvre Vold in 1910. He soon started to parcel out lots, starting with the area around the farm around World War I. In 1927 he put forward the idea of establishing Norway's first gallop horse racing track at Øvre Vold. The plan was approved by the central government despite local protests, creating Øvrevoll Galoppbane. Construction was carried through between 1930 and 1932.

Also, in 1916 he bought Hamang from Ebbe Astrup. Einar Hirsch died in October 1938.

References

1872 births
1938 deaths
People from Stange
Norwegian dentists
Norwegian magazine editors
Norwegian businesspeople
Norwegian landowners